Cracked Brain is the fourth full-length studio album by German thrash metal band Destruction, released in June 1, 1990. It is the band's only album to feature André Grieder of Poltergeist, replacing Schmier, who was fired after the initial sessions for the album. Also featured is a cover of The Knack song "My Sharona".

Recording and production 
Recording for Cracked Brain first started in 1989 but came to a halt when Destruction fired their vocalist and bassist Schmier. Guitarist Mike Sifringer recalled, "We recorded the basic tracks – drums and riff-guitars – at Union-Studios in Munich, a very expensive place. But Schmier was not happy with the music anymore, so what to do? We had to stop the recording session and went back home, everybody was pissed. In hindsight I know we made a wrong decision, we didn't talk enough. We did not meet for years after the split."

On the album's recording process, Sifringer said, "To save a bit of money we recorded bass and vocals in Berlin at Sky Track. A funny bloke named Gerdy, that's all I remember, was behind the desk there. Finally, the producer Guy Bidmead, Oli, Harry and I mixed the whole thing back in Munich." Destruction began re-recording Cracked Brain shortly after hiring André Grieder of Poltergeist as Schmier's replacement. Drummer Oliver Kaiser recalled, "André had been a long-time friend of ours – and still is. We asked him if he would like to finish Cracked Brain with us because we liked his melodious approach to thrash, his style was a bit Testament-influenced you might say. We knew there would never be another Schmier so we thought it'd be better to go into a different direction with the vocals. André really did a great job on Cracked Brain." He added, "When André flew up to Berlin for the recording sessions, I had everything already laid out for him. I sang the songs to him and he nailed them just like that."

Track listing 

All songs by Sifringer, Wilkens and Kaiser, except track 5 written by Doug Fieger and Berton Averre

Personnel 
Destruction
Mike Sifringer – guitar, bass
Harry Wilkens – guitar, bass
Oliver Kaiser – drums
André Grieder – vocals

Additional musician
Christian Engler – additional bass

Production
Andreas Marschall – cover art
Guy Bidmead – production

References 

1990 albums
Destruction (band) albums
Noise Records albums